Thomas Nachamayl (some sources N'Camail) was appointed Dean of Armagh  in 1475 and served until 1485.

References

Deans of Armagh
15th-century Irish Roman Catholic priests